Isidore Verheyden (24 January 1846, in Antwerp – 1 November 1905, in Elsene) was a Belgian painter of landscapes, portraits and still life.

He was the son of painter Jean-François Verheyden; his first teacher at the Académie Royale des Beaux-Arts in Brussels was Joseph Quinaux, and in 1866 he entered the studio of Jean-François Portaels for further study.  He also studied under the landscape painter Théodore Baron; he in turn taught Anna Boch.

Verheyden was a founding member of the anti-academic Société Libre des Beaux-Arts in 1868, and a member of Les XX from 1884 to 1886.

References

Biography at Answers.com

External links
 

1846 births
1905 deaths
Belgian landscape painters
19th-century Belgian painters
19th-century Belgian male artists